Daknopholis is a genus of African and Indian Ocean plants in the grass family. The only known species is Daknopholis boivinii, native to Kenya, Tanzania, Mozambique, Aldabra and Madagascar.

References

Chloridoideae
Grasses of Africa
Flora of Kenya
Flora of Madagascar
Flora of Mozambique
Flora of Tanzania
Monotypic Poaceae genera